Théodore Joseph Albéric Marie "Théo" Lefèvre (17 January 1914 – 18 September 1973) was a lawyer at the Ghent court of justice. In 1946 he became deputy of the Belgian parliament for the PSC-CVP. Between 25 April 1961 and 28 July 1965 he was the prime minister of Belgium.

Political career
Théo Lefèvre was elected to the Chamber of Representatives in 1946 and served until 1971, when he became a member of the Belgian Senate (1971-1973).

In September 1950 Lefèvre became Chairman of the PSC-CVP (1950-1961). In December 1958 he was appointed a Minister of State.

In 1961, after the fall of the fourth government of Gaston Eyskens and the following snap election, Lefèvre became Prime Minister of a coalition government with the Belgian socialists. During this period, the Belgian army intervened in Congo (Operation Dragon Rouge). His government encountered heavy opposition, and the planned health care reform only succeeded due to large concessions made by the government. Having become unpopular, Lefèvre lost the elections of 1965 and was excluded from the next government, which was a coalition government of Christian-democrats and liberals.

In 1968 Lefèvre was again included in the government led by Gaston Eyskens (Eyskens V) as a minister without portfolio, charged with scientific policy (1968-1972). In 1972 (Eyskens VI) he became state secretary for scientific policy (Jan. 1972 - Jan 1973).

Personal life
On 26 August 1944, Theo Lefèvre married Marie-José Billiaert (1918–1998). They had three children.

Honours 
 Minister of State, by royal Decree. 
 Commander in the Order of Leopold.
 Knight Grand Cross in the Order of the Crown.
 Knight Grand Cross in the Order of Merit of the Federal Republic of Germany.

References

External links
 Théo Lefèvre in ODIS - Online Database for Intermediary Structures 
 Archives of Théo Lefèvre in ODIS - Online Database for Intermediary Structures

1914 births
1973 deaths
Belgian Ministers of State
Belgian Roman Catholics
Christian Democratic and Flemish politicians
Christian Social Party (Belgium, defunct) politicians
MEPs for Belgium 1958–1979
Jurists from Ghent
Prime Ministers of Belgium
People of the Congo Crisis
Grand Crosses 1st class of the Order of Merit of the Federal Republic of Germany
Politicians from Ghent